Charles Tenshin Fletcher is a British-born American rōshi.

Biography
Born in Manchester, England, he moved to the United States in 1979 to study at the Zen Center of Los Angeles with founder Taizan Maezumi Rōshi, for whom he served as jisha (personal attendant). In 1994, he received Dharma transmission (authorization to teach) in the White Plum lineage from Taizan Maezumi Rōshi. He acted as administrator for many years at Zen Center of Los Angeles, and then was made abbot of Yokoji Zen Mountain Center in 1995 after the death of Taizan Maezumi Rōshi on May 15, 1995.

Charles Tenshin Fletcher Rōshi continues as the abbot at Yokoji Zen Mountain Center, in the San Jacinto Mountains, near Idyllwild, California.  He is certified as a Kokusai Fukyōshi ("Official Foreign Representative") by Sōtō-shū Shûmusôchô, that is, the Japanese Sōtō Zen sect.

Tenshin Rōshi has trained thoroughly in kōan and shikantaza as well as other more recently developed forms of practice. In addition to his work in the US, he returns to the UK annually to lead a sesshin near Liverpool.

Publications
Tenshin Rōshi co-authored Way of ZEN with David Shoji Scott (2001)

See also
Timeline of Zen Buddhism in the United States

References

External links
 Yokoji Zen Mountain Center, California (https://zmc.org/)
 White Plum Asanga, US (http://www.whiteplum.org)
 Green Mountain Zen, New Zealand (http://www.greenmountainzen.org.nz)
 StoneWater Zen Sangha, Liverpool, UK (http://www.stonewaterzen.org/)
 Citrus Zen (http://citruszen.com)
 Mojave Zen (https://mojavezen.com)
 Soto Zen International (https://web.archive.org/web/20080228015830/http://global.sotozen-net.or.jp/eng/org_tmpl_non_jpn.html)

Zen Buddhism writers
Soto Zen Buddhists
Zen Buddhist abbots
American Zen Buddhists
Living people
Year of birth missing (living people)
Rōshi